The Walking Dead is an American post-apocalyptic comic book series created by writer Robert Kirkman and artist Tony Moore – who was the artist on the first six issues and cover artist for the first twenty-four – with art on the remainder of the series by Charlie Adlard. Beginning in 2003 and published by Image Comics, the series ran for 193 issues, with Kirkman unexpectedly ending the series in 2019. Apart from a few specials, the comic was published primarily in black and white. It began publishing colorized versions issue by issue, colored by Dave McCaig, starting in October 2020.

The comic book series focuses on Rick Grimes, a Kentucky deputy who is shot in the line of duty and awakens from a coma in a zombie apocalypse that has resulted in a state-wide quarantine. After joining with some other survivors, he gradually takes on the role of leader of a community as it struggles to survive the zombie apocalypse. The Walking Dead received the 2007 and 2010 Eisner Award for Best Continuing Series at San Diego Comic-Con International.

The AMC television series The Walking Dead (2010–2022) loosely follows the storyline of the comic book. The Walking Dead franchise has also spawned multiple additional media properties, including two companion television series (Fear the Walking Dead and The Walking Dead: World Beyond), eight webisode series, video games (starting with The Walking Dead: The Game), and various additional publications, including novels (starting with The Walking Dead: Rise of the Governor).

Publication history 
Kirkman was a fan of zombie films such as the Living Dead series and Zombi 2 as well as zombie video games such as Resident Evil. The original pitch by Kirkman and Moore was for a follow-up to George A. Romero's Night of the Living Dead, with the series taking place in the 1960s. Image Comics co-founder Jim Valentino suggested using an original concept instead so the creators would own the property outright. The pitch was revised into an original story, taking a more traditional approach to a modern zombie survival tale. The revised pitch was again rejected, however, for being too "normal". Kirkman then pitched it again with a new added twist that the plague was sent by aliens, and that the comic would be more of an alien invasion story. Kirkman had no intention of making the comic about aliens, but felt that the lie was necessary to get the comic published, which it did.

The Walking Dead debuted in 2003, published by Image Comics, with art by Tony Moore for the first six issues and Cliff Rathburn shading the art after issue #5. Charlie Adlard took over as artist on issue #7, after he was approached by Kirkman. Moore also created the cover art for the first 24 issues and the first four trade paperbacks.  The remainder were done by Adlard. Most issues of the comic featured "Letter Hacks", several pages at the end where Kirkman discussed the issue, oftentimes answering letters, mail, and emails sent by readers of the comic. Kirkman usually co-wrote the section with his editor, Sean Mackiewicz.

When the television series premiered in October 2010, Image Comics announced The Walking Dead Weekly. The first 52 issues of the series began to be reprinted on January 5, 2011, with one issue per week for a year. The series is periodically re-published in trade paperbacks which contain six issues each, hardcover books with twelve issues and occasional bonus material, omnibus editions of twenty-four issues, and compendium editions of forty-eight issues.

In May 2018, Image Comics and its imprint Skybound Entertainment, the company that has driven development of The Walking Dead comic series since 2010, jointly announced The Walking Dead Day. The fan-oriented event was for October 13, 2018 and coincided with the release of a Walking Dead #1 15th Anniversary Variant Edition, with cover art by Charlie Adlard. A select number of The Walking Dead Day participating local comic shops became part of the comic's story line, with their own special edition of Adlard's anniversary cover, featuring the store's logo incorporated into the cover art. The company also noted that additional limited edition collectibles and festivities would be announced at a future date, prior to the October 2018 event.

On July 3, 2019, Kirkman confirmed through the "Letter Hacks" section of Issue #193 that the issue had concluded the series, with no previous announcements or warnings beforehand. Kirkman opted to end the comic on his own terms; he stated in his letter in issue #193 that part of the reason to end was that he feared he lacked material to continue the series for several more issues. He had envisioned the series to end around the time that Rick Grimes and his allies reach the Commonwealth, a large human community protected from the walkers, as this would allow him to give a complete arc. However, he found he got there too soon in terms of issues, with the Commonwealth first appearing around issue #150, and Kirkman feared there was no way he could get to an issue #300 with what ideas he had left. 

This ending came following the death of Rick Grimes, in issue #192. Kirkman kept the series' end a secret as he worked with Adlard to create cover art and solicitation information for Diamond Comic Distributors for non-existent issues through #196 that would have been released through October 2019, creating a storyline that hinted at the death of Carl Grimes, Rick's son, in the wake of Rick's death. Kirkman said that The Walking Dead comic was always built on surprise, and felt that it was necessary to surprise readers with the end of the series after covering enough of the aftermath of Rick's death in issues #192 and 193.

Image Comics announced in July 2020 that it will be republishing the full run of The Walking Dead in full color, with coloring by Dave McCaig. The first issue of the reprint was released on October 7, 2020, with subsequent comics beginning to be released twice a month from November 2020 onward. There are no present plans to release these in trade paperbacks.

Story arcs 

|}

Specials 
Michonne Special (March 16, 2012)
A story featuring Michonne in the early days of the outbreak, that also reveals the identity of her two pet walkers.
The Governor Special (February 13, 2013)
A story featuring The Governor in his early days as the leader of Woodbury, as well as the fate of Scott Moon.
Free Comic Book Day Special (May 4, 2013)
A collection of Morgan's, Michonne's, The Governor's and Tyreese's specials. 
Morgan Special (May 5, 2013)
A short story consisting of six pages, featuring Morgan during the winter of the apocalypse.
Tyreese Special (October 9, 2013)
The story of Tyreese, along with his daughter, Julie and her boyfriend, Chris, in the early days of the outbreak. 
The Walking Dead: The Alien (April 20, 2016)
The Walking Dead: The Alien is a brief story consisting of 32 pages, featuring Jeffrey Grimes as he deals with the outbreak in Barcelona, Spain
Here's Negan (April 27, 2016 – July 26, 2017, October 4, 2017 (Hardcover))
Here's Negan is a stand-alone volume of Image Comics' The Walking Dead, featuring the backstory of Negan. The story was initially serialized in four-page installments within the first sixteen issues of Image's monthly in-house magazine, Image+, published from April 2016 to July 2017. In November 2017, the story was collected and published as a 72-page hardcover volume.
Negan Lives! (July 1, 2020)
Negan Lives  is a one-shot story of Image Comics' The Walking Dead consisting of 36 pages, featuring Negan and following the character after Issue 174.
Rick Grimes 2000 (July 7, 2021 - August 4, 2021)
Rick Grimes 2000 is a five-chapter, non-canonic follow-up on an in-joke from issue #75, in which Grimes, after being knocked out by Michonne in the main story, abruptly awakens in a science fiction scenario, with the zombie infestation being explained as the precursor of an alien invasion.
Clementine Lives! (July 7, 2021)
Clementine Lives! serves as a bridge between the video game series and the upcoming Clementine graphic novel series.
Clementine (June 22, 2022 – )
 As Clementine continues northward, she encounters a group of Amish survivors and befriends Amos. She and Amos continue north to Vermont, where they find a group of teenagers working to convert a ski resort into a safe haven and settlement.

List of characters 

Rick Grimes is the protagonist and a former police deputy. The story begins when he wakes up from his comatose state in a hospital. Though he is initially separated from the two, Rick soon joins his wife Lori and his son Carl and their new group of survivors. Among the survivors are his former best friend Shane (who secretly has a sexual relationship with Rick's wife, Lori), firm clerk and college graduate Andrea, her sister Amy, a mechanic named Jim, a pizza delivery boy named Glenn, car salesman Dale, shoe salesman Allen and his wife, Donna, as well as their children, Ben and Billy. Lori and Carl form friendships with other survivors such as Carol and Sophia.

After leaving the camp, Rick gains a right-hand man and forms a close friendship with Tyreese, a man accompanied by his daughter and her boyfriend.  They soon find a farm run by Hershel Greene, after one of his hunters, Otis, accidentally shot Carl while hunting a deer.  Among Hershel's seven children is Maggie Greene, who forms a relationship with Glenn. As the group settle at a prison, they become conflicted with a group of surviving prisoners. Otis meets a katana-wielding survivor named Michonne, who is brought into the group, but struggles to acclimate, facing her own demons. Michonne, Rick and Glenn are later held in captivity by The Governor, a leader of a town called Woodbury who plan to take over the prison. Other Woodbury residents include Alice Warren, who changes sides to Rick's group and delivers Lori's baby, Bob Stookey, an army medic responsible for saving The Governor's life and Lilly, one of The Governor's soldiers.

After the prison assault, the remaining survivors regroup at Hershel's farm, and meet Abraham Ford, Eugene Porter and Rosita Espinosa. The group travel to Washington DC where they are hunted by Chris, encounter Gabriel Stokes, a priest, and are then recruited by Aaron and Eric to join the Alexandria Safe-Zone, a city run by congressman Douglas Monroe. Among the residents are Heath and Dr. Denise Cloyd, who quickly become close allies to the core group, and eventually the conflicted Nicholas. Douglas's son, Spencer tries to form a relationship with Andrea. Rick falls in love with Jessie Anderson, an abused wife. Abraham forms a relationship with Holly, a member of the construction crew.

A group of men, known as The Scavengers, tries to conquer Alexandria; the fight attracts a pack of walkers that invades the safe zone, which led to the death of many Alexandrians. After this, Rick and Andrea form a long-standing relationship.

Later, the safe zone starts a trading network with the Hilltop Colony, with help from its scout Paul "Jesus" Monroe. 
However, their safety is again threatened by the psychopathic Negan and his group known as The Saviors, who reside in a factory. The Hilltop and Alexandria join with The Kingdom, which is run by King Ezekiel, in a war against the Saviors. The war ends thanks to Dwight, a savior who decided to betray Negan.

After the war, newcomers such as Magna and Dante are introduced into the series. Oceanside, another community out at sea, is established, as well as safety perimeters across the DC area, which are violated by the presence of the Whisperers, a tribe of people disguised as the dead who have rejected the notion of re-establishing civilization. The leader, Alpha, antagonizes Rick as her daughter, Lydia, forms a romantic relationship with Carl. When Alpha's second in command, Beta, takes leadership of the group, he declares war against the communities.

The undead/reanimated
Rick's group classifies the undead as either walkers, roamers or lurkers, the former being more likely to venture toward a loud noise in search of human prey. Other names have been used by characters in the series, including biters and stinkers.  The undead follow and mimic each other, which can result in enormous hordes travelling together, "walking nonstop, following a sound they've all forgotten," as Abraham puts it. When asked about the origins of zombies, Kirkman claimed that there was an answer but that it was unimportant to the story-line. At the same time, it was reported that when Kirkman pitched the series he had claimed that the virus was an alien biological attack in preparation of a full-scale invasion but that he had no intention of following this idea.

Reception 

The series received critical acclaim, winning the Eisner Award for Best Continuing Series in 2010 and prompting Eric Sunde of IGN comics to call it "one of the best monthly comics available". Among its fans are author Max Brooks. Because of the popularity of the series, which increased considerably when it was adapted into a television series of the same name, artist Tony Moore's original artwork for the series' early issues has gone up in value; on the March 28, 2013 episode of the VH1 reality television series For What It's Worth, Moore's original artwork for Page 7 of issue #1 was professionally appraised to be worth $20,000.

Other media

Television adaptations 

AMC picked up the rights to produce a show based on the comic in 2009. It ordered a pilot episode on January 21, 2010 and began filming on May 15, 2010. The series premiered on October 31, 2010 with high ratings. On November 8, 2010, after broadcasting two episodes, AMC renewed The Walking Dead for a second season of 13 episodes, which began on October 16, 2011. The TV show is loosely inspired by the comic, introducing new characters and deviating from the comic in certain plot points.

The fifth season premiered on October 12, 2014, with Scott M. Gimple as the show's third showrunner. Gimple has said that he would stay closer in line to the comic book series events "as much as possible", but ultimately remix stories with certain characters, referencing original characters introduced to the show and deceased characters alive in the comic book as a reason for this. Robert Kirkman himself has mentioned that the series will follow much closer to the comic series with Gimple's run. With the series' ninth season, which started broadcast in October 2018, Angela Kang was promoted to showrunner with Gimple now in charge of all Walking Dead properties at AMC. This also was accompanied by the largest deviation from the comics, with the departure of Rick Grimes, played by Andrew Lincoln, from the show, though Lincoln will reprise Rick in three feature-length films to be produced as AMC Originals that continue Rick's story with Kirkman's involvement.

A companion television series, titled Fear the Walking Dead, debuted on AMC on August 23, 2015. The series features new original characters, and it is set in the city of Los Angeles, California starting prior to the zombie apocalypse. It explores these new characters as the apocalypse begins. The series was created by Robert Kirkman and Dave Erickson, with Erickson serving as showrunner for the series. AMC ordered the series for a two-season commitment, with the first season consisting of six episodes.

Animation comic 
AMC released an animated short of the first part of Issue No. 1 of the comic with animation by Juice Films, voice acting by Phil LaMarr and art by Tony Moore.

Telltale's The Walking Dead 

Telltale Games, an adventure game developer, secured the rights with Kirkman to make an episodic video game inspired by The Walking Dead comic book series in 2011. While video games have frequently dealt with the zombie genre, Kirkman said of Telltale's game that "it [focuses] more on characterization and emotion than action". Telltale opted to take a new approach to the typical adventure game, making it so that players would have to make decisions through conversation trees or through quick time events, that would propagate through the episode and as determinants into future ones, as to give more weight to the character-driven nature of their game.

Telltale's game, The Walking Dead, first released in 2012, and followed the characters of Lee Everett, a former teacher convicted of murder, and Clementine, a pre-teen girl left alone at the start of the zombie apocalypse; it contained tie-ins with the comic by brief appearances of Glenn Rhee and Hershel Greene, narratively prior to their first appearances in the comic series. The series was a critical success, with much of the praise for the characterization of Clementine and Lee, and is stated to have caused a resurgence in the waning adventure game market since 2000. Telltale went on to develop a full-fledged series, with three additional seasons, additional downloadable content for the first season, and a spin-off title based on Michonne. In all but this spin-off, choices made by players in earlier games continued to set determinants used in later games as the stories followed Clementine's continued struggles to survive as she grows up in the years that followed.

In the midst of releasing the planned final season of The Walking Dead series during 2018, Telltale Games went into bankruptcy, laying off the bulk of the staff and cancelling all projects, including the last two episodes of The Walking Dead. By this point, Kirkman had established Skybound Entertainment and had been eyeing a gaming division. He took the opportunity to secure the rights of Telltale's The Walking Dead properties, and temporarily hired most of the staff that were working on the game so that the series could be finished as well as to close out Clementine's story, which he felt needed to be done. Additionally, with these rights, Skybound took over future publication of Telltale's series, and will publish a remastered version of all four seasons and additional content, featuring graphical improvements that Telltale had made ahead of starting the fourth season.

The Walking Dead: All Out War 

In January 2016, the Kings of War creator Mantic Games announced plans to release a tabletop miniature wargame based on The Walking Dead, named The Walking Dead: All Out War. The miniatures game was funded through the popular crowdfunding site Kickstarter. This product is available for order and first began shipping to backers on November 7, 2016.

Novels 

A series of novels based on the comics, written by Robert Kirkman and Jay Bonansinga, were released between 2011 and 2014 focusing on the antagonist "The Governor". Taking place in the initial outbreak, the books chronicle his experiences from surviving in the newly ravaged world to the establishment of himself as leader of Woodbury, and finally tying up the conclusion to the prison arc storyline in the comics.

Following The Walking Dead: The Fall of the Governor, Bonansinga continued the Walking Dead novels as sole author, with Kirkman's name affixed to the title.

Collected editions 
The series has so far been assembled into the following collections:

Trade paperbacks 
The trade paperbacks collect story arcs of six issues each, but contain only the story and none of the original cover art from the comics. Each paperback follows the convention of having a three-word title. The zombies in the cover art for each paperback form part of a larger image if placed end to end. This also loops, as the final zombie on Volume 32 connects to the first on Volume 1.

Each story arc is re-released in hardcover books containing two, omnibus editions containing four, and compendiums containing eight story arcs.

Hardcovers 
All hardcovers contain the contents of the comics, including the covers, and in some cases bonus material. The books' trim size is larger than the paperbacks. Each hardcover contains two story arcs from the series. Signed versions of the books are available, each limited to 310 pieces.

Omnibus editions 
Limited omnibus editions collect roughly 24 issues in a slipcase with several extras. The first volume is autographed by Kirkman and Adlard, with 300 copies printed. Subsequent volumes had print runs of 3000 each, along with deluxe limited editions (signed by Kirkman/Adlard) of 300 copies.

Compendium editions 
Softcover compendium editions collect approximately 48 comic issues each. They are also available as limited hardcover editions (Red Foil Version for Compendium 1, Gold Foil Version for Compendium 2, and Gold Foil Version for Compendium 3).

Box sets

Other publications 

Several ancillary books and a special edition have also been published:

References

Comic books

External links

American comics
Comics adapted into television series
Comics adapted into video games
Comics by Robert Kirkman
Eisner Award winners for Best Continuing Series
Mental health in fiction
 Comic book